Parapsycho – Spectrum of Fear (German: Parapsycho - Spektrum der Angst) is a 1975 Austrian horror film directed by Peter Patzak, starring Marisa Mell, Leon Askin and Debra Berger. Split into three episodes, it uses extrasensory perception, reincarnation and telepathy as its subject matter. Even in the school of New German Cinema, the film was ground breaking for using footage of a real autopsy, beginning with the incision of the body from sternum to pubic bone, rather than recreating the scene using prosthetics or special effects.

Cast
Reinkarnation:
 Marisa Mell – Greta
 Peter Neusser – Harry
 Leon Askin – The old man

Metempsychose:
 Mascha Gonska – Mascha, eine Medizinstudentin
 William Berger – Pathologie-Professor, ihr Liebhaber
 Signe Seidel – seine Frau
 Debra Berger – Debbie, beider Tochter

Telepathie:
 Mathieu Carrière – Mario, Kunstmaler
 Alexandra Drewes – Barbara, die junge Braut
 Helmut Förnbacher – der junge Bräutigam
 Heinz Marecek – Marios bester Freund
 Jane Tilden – Marios Mutter

References

1975 films
1975 horror films
Austrian horror films
1970s supernatural horror films
Films directed by Peter Patzak
Horror anthology films
1970s German-language films